The Pray for the Wicked Tour was a concert tour by Panic! at the Disco, in support of the project's sixth studio album Pray for the Wicked (2018). The tour began in Minneapolis on July 11, 2018, and  concluded in Rio de Janeiro on October 3, 2019. The tour sold over one million tickets. This was also the last Panic! tour where songs off Vices and Virtues were performed.

Background and development 
On March 21, 2018, the band released the latest music video for "Say Amen (Saturday Night)" and a new single "(Fuck A) Silver Lining". With the release came the announcement of a summer tour. Arizona and Hayley Kiyoko were announced as the opening acts.

Controversy
Touring guitarist Kenny Harris officially departed from the band's touring line-up in September 2018. This occurred two days following the surfacing of sexual misconduct claims made against Harris on Twitter.  The band said that Harris’ departure was due to "a personal matter" on their Twitter. Harris was replaced by 
Mike Naran for the remainder of the tour.

Commercial performance
As of March 27, 2019, the "Pray for the Wicked Tour" has totaled $49 million, excluding the European dates yet to be reported, a remarkable 170 percent increase over the Death of a Bachelor Tour's $18.1 million, which was already a giant leap forward from the act's co-headline tour with Weezer and its headline Vices & Virtues Tour.

Set list 
{{hidden
| titlestyle = background: #ccccff; font-size: 100%; width: 100%; text-align:center;
| bodystyle = text-align: left; font-size: 100%; width: 100%;
| title  =  2018
| content =
This set list is from the concert on July 11, 2018, in Minneapolis.

 "(Fuck A) Silver Lining"
 "Don't Threaten Me with a Good Time"
 "Ready to Go (Get Me Out of My Mind)"
 "Hey Look Ma, I Made It"
 "LA Devotee"
 "Hallelujah"
 "The Ballad of Mona Lisa"
 "Nine in the Afternoon"
 "Golden Days"
 "Casual Affair"
 "Vegas Lights"
 "Dancing's Not a Crime"
 "This Is Gospel"
 "Death of a Bachelor"
 "I Can't Make You Love Me" 
 "Dying in LA"
 "Girls / Girls / Boys"
 "Nicotine"
 "Girls Just Want to Have Fun" 
 "High Hopes"
 "Miss Jackson"
 "King of the Clouds"
 "Crazy=Genius"
 "Bohemian Rhapsody"
 "Emperor's New Clothes"
Encore
 "Say Amen (Saturday Night)"
 "I Write Sins Not Tragedies"
 "Victorious"
}}
{{hidden
| titlestyle = background: #ccccff; font-size: 100%; width: 100%; text-align:center;
| bodystyle = text-align: left; font-size: 100%; width: 100%;
| title  =  2019
| content = This set list is from the concert on January 10, 2019, in Buffalo.

 “(Fuck a) Silver Lining”
 “Don't Threaten Me With a Good Time”
 “Ready to Go (Get Me Out of My Mind)”
 “Hey Look Ma, I Made It”
 “LA Devotee”
 “Hallelujah”
 “Crazy=Genius”
 “The Ballad of Mona Lisa”
 “Nine in the Afternoon”
 “One of the Drunks”
 “Casual Affair”
 “Vegas Lights”
 “Dancing's Not a Crime”
 “This Is Gospel”
 “Death of a Bachelor”
 “I Can't Make You Love Me”
 “Dying in LA”
 “The Greatest Show”
 “Girls/Girls/Boys”
 “King of the Clouds”
 “High Hopes”
 “Miss Jackson”
 “Roaring 20s”
 “Bohemian Rhapsody
 “Emperor's New Clothes”
Encore
“Say Amen (Saturday Night)”
 “I Write Sins Not Tragedies”
 “Victorious”
}}

Tour dates

Festivals and other miscellaneous performances
This concert is a part of the Reading Festival
This concert is a part of the Leeds Festival
This concert is a part of Corona Capital
This concert is a part of Riptide Music festival.
This concert is a part of 97X Next Big Thing festival.
This concert is a part of Houston Livestock Show and Rodeo
This concert is a part of Firefly Music Festival
This concert is a part of Music Midtown festival.
This concert is a part of Rock in Rio festival.

Personnel
Brendon Urie – lead vocals, guitar, piano, keyboards
Dan Pawlovich – drums, percussion, tambourine, backing vocals
Nicole Row – bass guitar, keyboards, synthesizer, backing vocals
Kenneth Harris – lead guitar, backing vocals, keyboards (July 11, 2018 – August 26, 2018)
Mike Naran – lead guitar, backing vocals, keyboards (October 6, 2018 – October 3, 2019)

Notes

References 

2018 concert tours
2019 concert tours
Panic! at the Disco